Peter Sciberras is an Australian film editor. He was nominated for an Academy Award in the category Best Film Editing for the film The Power of the Dog.

Selected filmography 
 Hail (2011)
 The Rover (2014)
 War Machine (2017)
 The King (2019)
 The Power of the Dog (2021; nominated)
 Foe (TBA)

References

External links 

Living people
Year of birth missing (living people)
Place of birth missing (living people)
Australian film editors